Seer Gharbi,, is  one of the 51 union councils of Abbottabad District in Khyber-Pakhtunkhwa province of Pakistan. It is located in the southeastern part of the province, bordering the Rawalpindi District of Punjab province (the Murree Hills area).

Seer Gharbi also shares a border with the following Union Councils within Abbottabad District - to the north by Tajwal, to the east Nara and Nagri Totial, to the South by Seer Sharqi Bhattian and to the west by Palak.

The terrain of the whole area is hilly and mountainous, to the South lie the plains of the Punjab, travellers from the South find the land rising, the Murree region signals the start of the Himalayan mountain range. The higher altitude makes the climate of this area cooler than the land to the south, and there is usually heavy snowfall in the winter blocking roads and making travel difficult.

A notable tourist area of Seer Gharbi is the hill resort of Changlagali.

There are no cities in Seer Gharbi, it is mainly a mountainous rural area, the town of Seer is the largest settlement, the nearest cities to people living in Seer Gharbi are, Murree to the South, Abbottabad (the district capital to the North West), Haripur (to the east) as well as Muzaffarabad to the North east.

History 
Seer Gharbi(سیرغربی) is one of 51 union council of Abbottabad Along with murree in Galyat region. Seer Gharbi is enriched with history and culture before partition in 1947 Seer is centre of culture and traditions.

Seer has fertile land, high mountains, small rivers, and water falls.

The language spoken in the area is pahari (پہاڑی) with same accent in murree.

2005 earthquake
On 8 October 2005 Seer Gharbi, like much of Abbottabad district, was affected by the 2005 Kashmir earthquake. However human casualties were low, the damage was largely to infrastructure - including damage to water supplies

Subdivisions

The Union Council of Seer Gharbi is subdivided into the following areas: Basbher, Malmola and Seer Gharbi.

References

Union councils of Abbottabad District